Variations on a Blue Line (subtitled 'Round Midnight) is a live album by multi-instrumentalist and composer Joe McPhee, recorded in 1977 and first released on the Swiss HatHut label in 1979.

Reception

Allmusic gave the album 4½ stars.

Track listing 
All compositions by Joe McPhee except as indicated
 "Beanstalk" - 17:06
 "Motian Studies" - 7:39
 "Variations on a Blue Line (After a Theme for Knox)" - 6:33
 "'Round Midnight" (Thelonious Monk) - 5:05

Personnel 
Joe McPhee - tenor saxophone, soprano saxophone

References 

Joe McPhee live albums
1979 live albums
Hathut Records live albums